In typesetting software, TeX Directory Structure (TDS) is a directory hierarchy for macros, fonts, and the other implementation-independent TeX system files. The top-level directories are

TDS is used by several TeX distributions, including teTeX, TeX Live and MiKTeX.

See also 

TeX Live
TeX
LaTeX

External links 
 
 HTML documentation on the TeX users group site

Free TeX software